Cassia aubrevillei is a plant species in the family Fabaceae. A forest tree of tropical West Africa, it is threatened by deforestation and unsustainable logging for timber.  The bark of the tree has been investigated for antifilarial properties.

References

aubrevillei
Flora of Ivory Coast
Flora of Gabon
Vulnerable plants
Taxonomy articles created by Polbot
Taxa named by François Pellegrin